Maccabi Rishon LeZion is a handball team from the city of Rishon LeZion, Israel. competes in the Ligat Winner Big. The team's colors are yellow and blue, and it hosts its home games in the new 1500-seat bet maccabi in Rishon LeZion.

Maccabi have won 16 championships and 10 Israeli cups. After some bad years in the 1990s, the team returned to success: between 2003 and 2007 it won three championships and four cups.

The team's biggest achievement in the European Cups was on its first appearance there in 1983 when it reached the Cup Winner's Cup semifinal, losing to the Spanish team FC Barcelona Handbol.

Their biggest rival is Hapoel Rishon LeZion, another great Rishon LeZion team. The derby games between them have been very tense throughout the last two decades.

Titles 
Israel Champions (16): 1959, 1985, 1986, 1987, 1989, 1992, 2005, 2006, 2007, 2009, 2010, 2011, 2012, 2017, 2020, 2021
Israel Cup Holder (10): 1982, 1986, 1987,  1988, 2003, 2004, 2006, 2007, 2011, 2013

Squad 
Updated on 11 January 2020

 Coach:
 Fitnnes Trainer: Yoram Menachem
 Administration Manager: Yankul Ruiter
 Chair Man: Yossi Geva

European record

Notable former players 
   Milorad Krivokapić
  Andrey Starykh
  Duško Milinović
  Renato Vugrinec
  Robert Markotić (2016–2017)
  Ivan Karačić 
  David Rašić

References

Handball clubs established in 1950
Israeli handball clubs
Handball